This is a list of aircraft produced or proposed by the Lockheed Aircraft Corporation from its founding as the Lockheed Aircraft Company in 1926 to its merging with Martin Marietta to form the Lockheed Martin Corporation in 1995.

Ordered by model number, Lockheed gave most of its aircraft astronomical names, from the first Vega to the C-5 Galaxy. Aircraft models listed in italics and with higher numbers – 780 following 80 and preceding 81, for example – are variants or developments of the base model.

{| class="wikitable sortable"
|- style="background:#efefef;"
! Model
! Name
! First flight
! Remarks
|-
| 1
| Vega
| July 4, 1927
| six-passenger monoplane
|-
| 2
| Vega
|
|
|-
| 3
| Air Express
| April 1928
|  
|-
| 4
| Explorer
| 1928
|  
|-
| 5
| Vega
| 1928
|  
|-
| 6
| unknown
|  
| model number not used
|-
| 7
| Explorer Special
|  
|  
|-
| 8
| Sirius
| 1929
|  
|-
|  8A
| Altair
| 1930
|  
|-
|  8D
| Altair
| 1930
|  
|-
| 9
| Orion
| April, 1931
|  
|-
| 10
| Electra
| February 23, 1934
| twin-engine transport
|-
| 11
| design study
|  
| six-passenger transport
|-
| 12
| Electra Junior
| June 27, 1936
| six-passenger transport, scaled-down version of Model 10
|-
|  212
| L-212
|
| bomber trainer version
|-
| 13
| unknown
|  
| model number not used
|-
| 14
| Super Electra
| July 29, 1937
| passenger transport, scaled-up version of Model 10
|-
| 15
| PV-1 Ventura
| July 31, 1941
| naval patrol bomber
|-
| 16
| design study
|  
| unbuilt derivative of Model 10
|-
| 17
| unknown
|  
| model number not used
|-
| 18
| Lodestar
| September 21, 1939
| passenger transport (military version, C-60 cargo transport), stretched Model 14
|-
| 19
| design study
|  
| unbuilt derivative of Model 14
|-
| 20
| XP-58 Chain Lightning
| June 6, 1944
| long-range interceptor version of the P-38 Lightning (model 022)
|-
| 21
| Ventura
|  
| patrol bomber
|-
| 22
| P-38 Lightning
| January 27, 1939
| World War II fighter
|-
|  122
| P-38 Lightning
| 1941
| YP-38 through P-38D
|-
|  222
| P-38 Lightning
| 
| P-38E through P-38H
|-
|  322
| P-322 Lightning
| 
| export variant, impressed into U.S. service at war's outbreak
|-
|  422
| P-38 Lightning
| 
| P-38J through P-38M
|-
|  522
| XP-49
| November, 1942
| advanced fighter prototype, based on P-38
|-
|  622
| XP-38A Lightning
| June 6, 1944
| pressurized conversion of a P-38
|-
|  822
| P-38 Lightning
| 
| navalized P-38 proposal
|-
| 23
| P-49
| never flown
| production version of XP-49
|-
| 24
|  
|  
| proposed naval version of P-38 Lightning
|-
| 25
| model number not used
|  
|  
|-
| 26
| P-2 Neptune
| May 17, 1945
| patrol bomber and anti-submarine warfare aircraft
|-
| 27
|  
|  
| proposed twin-engine canard transport
|-
| 28
| model number not used
|  
|  
|-
| 29
|  
|  
| proposed twin-engine bomber
|-
| 30
|  
|  
| proposed twin-engine canard bomber
|-
| 31
|  
|  
| proposed export version of Model 29
|-
| 32
|  
|  
| proposed reconnaissance version of Model 18
|-
| 33
| Little Dipper
| August, 1944
|  
|-
| 34
| Big Dipper
| December 10, 1945
|  
|-
| 35
|  
|  
| military trainer design from North American Aviation
|-
| 36
| model number not used
|  
|  
|-
| 37
| Ventura
|  
| patrol bomber
|-
|  137
| B-34
|
| 
|-
|  437
| B-37
|
| 
|-
| 38
| model number not used
|  
|  
|-
| 39
| model number not used
|  
|  
|-
| 40
|  
|  
| aerial target
|-
| 41
|  
|  
| aerial target proposal
|-
| 42
|  
|  
| aerial target proposal
|-
| 43
| unknown
|  
|  
|-
| 44
| Excalibur
| never flown
| unbuilt four-engine predecessor to Constellation
|-
| 45
|  
|  
| proposed radio control vehicle
|-
| 46-48
| unknown
|  
|  
|-
| 49
| Constellation
| January 9, 1943
| four-engine airliner
|-
|  049
| Constellation
| January 9, 1943
| original passenger version
|-
|  149
| Constellation
| 
| extra wing fuel tanks
|-
|  249
| XB-30
| Never flown
| redesignation of XB-30 (model 051); cancelled in favor of the B-29 and B-32
|-
|  349
| C-69 Constellation
| Never flown
| unbuilt C-69B long range troop/cargo transport
|-
|  449
| Constellation
| Never flown
| unknown airliner proposal
|-
|  549
| C-69 Constellation
| 
| C-69C VIP transport
|-
|  649
| Constellation
| October 18, 1946
| improved passenger version
|-
|  749
| Constellation
| March 14, 1947
| longer range version of model 649 
|-
|  849
| Constellation
| Never flown
| unbuilt turbo-compound R-3350 powered version of model 749
|-
|  949
| Constellation
| Never flown
| unbuilt passenger/cargo convertible version of model 849
|-
|  1049
| Super Constellation
| October 13, 1950
| improved Constellation
|-
|  1149
| Super Constellation
| Never flown
| unbuilt Allison turboprop powered version of the model 1049
|-
|  1249
| Super Constellation
| September 1, 1954
| experimental turboprop military transport version
|-
|  1349
| N/A
| Never flown
| model number skipped
|-
|  1449
| Super Constellation
| Never flown
| stretched turbine powered version of model 1049 with larger wings
|-
|  1549
| Super Constellation
| Never flown
| further stretched version of model 1449
|-
|  1649
| Starliner
| October 11, 1956
| final version of Constellation
|-
| 50
|  
|  
| proposed liaison aircraft
|-
| 51
| XB-30
| never flown
| proposed bomber version of Constellation, later redesignated model 249
|-
| 52
|  
|  
| proposed single-engine fighter
|-
| 53-59
| unknown
|  
|  
|-
| 60
|  
| never flown
| proposed twin-engine trainer
|-
| 61
|  
| never flown
| proposed twin-engine trainer
|-
| 62
|  
| never flown
| proposed twin-engine trainer
|-
| 63-70
| unknown
|  
|  
|-
| 71-73
|  
|  
| model numbers reserved for Lockheed-Georgia
|-
| 74
| unknown
|  
|  
|-
| 75
| Saturn
| June 17, 1947
| small passenger airplane
|-
| 76-79
|  
|  
| model numbers reserved for Lockheed-Georgia
|-
| 80
| P-80 Shooting Star
| June 10, 1944
| United States' first operational jet fighter
|-
|  080
| P-80 Shooting Star
|
| YP-80A-P-80C
|-
|  380
| P-80 Shooting Star
|
| unbuilt naval proposal
|-
|  480
| P-80 Shooting Star
|
| unbuilt naval proposal
|-
|  580
| T-33 Shooting Star
| March 22, 1948
| trainer; originally designated TP-80C and TF-80C
|-
|  680
| F-80D Shooting Star
|
| unbuilt version with engine upgrade
|-
|  780
| F-94 Starfire
| April 16, 1949
| all-weather jet fighter
|-
|  880
| F-94C Starfire
| 
| redesigned tail & wing with rocket pods
|-
|  980
| YF-94D Starfire
| 
| unbuilt ground attack version
|-
|  1080
| T2V-1 SeaStar
| 
| naval trainer
|-
| 81
| XFV-1
| December 23, 1953
| prototype tailsitter
|-
| 82
| C-130 Hercules
| August 23, 1954
| four-engine medium transport
|-
|  182
| C-130 Hercules
| 
| All early models, including mission-specific variants
|-
|  282
| C-130 Hercules
| 
| C-130B and later, including variants
|-
|  382
| C-130 Hercules, L-100
| 
| Later models, including variants and -30 stretch"
|-
| 83
| F-104 Starfighter
| February 28, 1954
| supersonic interceptor
|-
| 84
| W2V-1
| never flown
| turboprop WV (EC-121 Warning Star) variant; contract cancelled
|-
| 85
| P-3 Orion
| April 15, 1961
| military patrol aircraft developed from the Electra (88/188)
|-
| 86
| XH-51A
| September 29, 1962
| attack helicopter prototype
|-
| 87
| AH-56A Cheyenne
| September 21, 1967
| CL-840, experimental helicopter
|-
| 88
| L-188 Electra
| December 6, 1957
| turboprop airliner
|-
| 89
| R6O/R6V Constitution
| November 9, 1946
| large transport prototype
|-
|  389| 
| 
| unbuilt airliner version|-
|  489| 
| 
| unbuilt airliner version|-
| 90
| XF-90
| June 3, 1949
| jet bomber escort prototype
|-
| 91
| L-2000
| never flown
| proposed supersonic transport (SST)
|-
| 92
|  
|  
| proposed civil helicopter
|-
| 93
| L-1011 Tristar
| November 16, 1970
| tri-engine, widebody airliner
|-
| 94
| S-3 Viking
| January 21, 1972
| submarine hunter
|-
| 95-98
| unknown
|  
|  
|-
| 99
|  
| never flown
| cancelled USAF interceptor
|-
| 129
| Model X
| 
| 1941 high-altitude bomber project competing for Type Specification XC-124 against B-27 and B-28
|-
| 133
| L-133
| never flown
| cancelled jet fighter aircraft
|-
| 136
| 
| 
| enlarged Constellation project, 1944; evolved into the Model 89/R6V
|-
| 140
| XP-80 Shooting Star
| January 8, 1944
| experimental jet fighter
|-
| 141
| XP-80A Shooting Star
| 
| experimental jet fighter
|-
| 171
| X-7
| April 26, 1951
| unmanned test bed for ramjet engines and missile guidance
|-
| 193
| L-193 Constellation II
|
| jetliner/aerial tanker concept
|-
| 245
| L-245
| 
| converted T-33 used by the company for development of the T2V-1 (model 1080)
|-
| 246
| Lockheed XF-104
| March 4, 1954
| interceptor prototype, led to the F-104
|-
| 295
| CL-295
|  
| design studies for a 'tail-sitting' VTOL fighter
|-
| 300
| C-141 Starlifter
| December 17, 1963
| large jet transport
|-
| 301
| L-301
| never flown
| hypersonic research project; sometimes called X-24C
|-
| 320
| CL-320
|  
| intermediate long-range high-speed interceptor project
|-
| 325
| CL-325
|  
| Reconnaissance aircraft project, predecessor to CL-400 Suntan design
|-
| 329
| JetStar
| September 4, 1957
| business jet
|-
|  1329| JetStar|
| business jet|-
|  2329| JetStar II| 
| business jet|-
| 346
| CL-346
|  
| proposals for supersonic VTOL fighters, based on the F-104
|-
| 351
| U-2
| August 4, 1955
| CL-282, high-altitude spyplane
|-
| 379
| CL-379
|  
| tilt-wing research aircraft project
|-
| 400
| CL-400 Suntan
|  
| proposal for Mach 2.5 reconnaissance aircraft, liquid hydrogen fueled
|-
| 400
| L-400 Twin Hercules
|  
| proposed twin-engine version of C-130
|-
| 407
| CL-407
|  
| proposals for supersonic VTOL attack and reconnaissance aircraft
|-
| 414
| Hudson
| December 10, 1938
| bomber, reconnaissance aircraft
|- 
| 475
| CL-475
|  
| prototype helicopter
|-
| 500
| C-5 Galaxy
| June 30, 1968
| large jet transport
|-
| 645
| F-22 Raptor
| September 7, 1997
| air superiority stealth fighter
|-
|  090P|
| 
| Lockheed submission for ATF (Advanced Tactical Fighter) Demonstration/Validation|-
|  1132| YF-22A Lightning II
| September 29, 1990| technology demonstrator (632 is the associated design iteration that evolved into EMD submission)|-
|  645| F-22A Raptor| September 7, 1997| EMD and operational aircraft|-
| 760
| CL-760
|  
| Lockheed proposal for the LARA (Light Armed Reconnaissance Aircraft), competition won by the OV-10 Bronco
|-
| 823
| CL-823
|  
| designs for SST (Super Sonic Transport)
|-
| 901
| CL-901
| September 1966
| Converted F-104 for advanced air superiority
|-
| 934
| CL-934
|  
| interceptor variant of the F-104
|-
| 977-16
| CL-977-16
|  
| composite helicopter
|-
| 981
| CL-981
|  
| enlarged variant of the F-104, developed into the CL-1200
|-
| 984
| CL-984
|  
| strike variant of the F-104
|-
| 985
| CL-985B
|  
| development of the CL-984 for Belgium
|-
| 1026
| CL-1026
|  
| designs for a commercial helicopter, using the rigid-rotor system from the Cheyenne.
|-
| 1195
| CL-1195
|  
| designs for fighter, proposal for the "Free World Fighter" program circa 1969
|-
| 1200
| CL-1200 Lancer
|  
| development of the F-104. became CL-1600 / X-27
|-
| 1800
| CL-1800
|  
| helicopter project
|-
|  
| XFM-2
| 1930s
| heavy fighter, bomber destroyer, cancelled
|-
|  
| YP-24
| 1931
| fighter, ground-attack aircraft
|-
|  
| XC-35
| May 9, 1935
| experimental aircraft
|-
|  
| X-27 Lancer
| never flown
| CL-1600, cancelled replacement of F-104 Starfighter
|-
|  
| TR-1/U-2R| August 1, 1981
| advanced U-2|-
|  
| ER-2/U-2ER|  
| NASA U-2|-
|  
| A-12 Oxcart
| April 26, 1962
| CIA supersonic spyplane
|-
|  
| YF-12 Blackbird
| August 7, 1963
| supersonic interceptor prototype
|-
|  
| SR-71 Blackbird
| December 22, 1964
| USAF supersonic spyplane
|-
|  
| YO-3A Quiet Star 
| 1966
| Reconnaissance
|-
|  
| LASA-60
| September 15, 1959
| Light Utility Sport Aircraft
|-
|  
| XV-4/XV-10 Hummingbird
| July 7, 1962
| VTOL prototype
|-
|  
| X-26B
|  
|  
|-
|  
| Have Blue (XST)
| December, 1977
| stealth technology testbed
|-
|  
| F-117 Nighthawk
| June 18, 1981
| stealth attack aircraft
|-
|  
| Flatbed
| 1980s
| military transport aircraft project, cancelled
|-
|  
| P-7
| 1980s
| maritime-patrol aircraft project, cancelled
|-
|}

 Unmanned Aerial Vehicles 
 Lockheed Aequare
 Lockheed AQM-60 Kingfisher
 Lockheed MQM-105 Aquila
 Lockheed D-21
 Lockheed X-7

 See also 
 Vega Aircraft Corporation
 Lockheed Constellation variants

References

 Sources 
 Breffort, Dominique. Lockheed Constellation: from Excalibur to Starliner Civilian and Military Variants. Paris: Histoire and Collecions, 2006. Print. 
 US Warplanes – C-69/C-121 Retrieved 10/9/11 US Warplanes – P-38  Retrieved 10/9/11 US Warplanes – Shooting Star Series
 Boyne, Walter J, Beyond the Horizons: The Lockheed Story. St. Martin's Press: New York, 1998.
 Lockheed-Martin products
 Pace, Steve, Lockheed Skunk Works. Motorbooks International: Osceola, WI, 1992.
 Royal Air Force Museum Aircraft Thesaurus
 Yenne, Bill, Lockheed''. Crescent Books, 1987.
 Lockheed – Manufacturers, Builders and Designers – 1000 Aircraft Photos.com 

 
Lockheed